Gylfi is a mythological Norse king. Other people with Gylfi as a given name include:

Gylfi Einarsson, Icelandic footballer
Gylfi Gylfason, Icelandic handball player
Gylfi Magnússon, Icelandic economist
Gylfi Sigurðsson, Icelandic footballer
Gylfi Zoega, Icelandic economist
Gylfi Þorsteinsson Gíslason, Icelandic politician
Sigurður Gylfi Magnússon, Icelandic historian